This is a list of assets owned by the New York Times Company.

Business units

Media properties 
 The New York Times
 The New York Times International Edition
 The New York Times International Weekly
 T: The New York Times Style Magazine
 The New York Times Book Review
 The New York Times Magazine
 The New York Times Licensing Group (NYTLicensing)
 NYTimes.com
 TimesDigest

Other properties (related to the New York Times brand) 
 Times Books
 T Brand Studio
 The New York Times Idea Lab
 Times Wine Club
 Times Film Club
 Times Journeys
 NYTLive
 The New York Times Thought Leadership Conferences
 The New York Times Travel Show
 TimesTalks
 Live Read
 The School of The New York Times
 The New York Times Store
 TheTimesCenter

Other assets
 Abuzz Technologies
 The Athletic
 Audm
 Blogrunner
 Wirecutter
 Wordle

Joint ventures
 The New York Times Building (58%) with Brookfield Asset Management

Investments

 Scroll (web service)

Investment portfolio 
 Atlas Obscura
 Automattic
 Betaworks
 Blendle
 Dynamic Yield
 Enigma
 Federated Media Publishing (FMP)
 Heleo
 The History Project
 Keep Holdings
 Keywee
 Panjo
 Seen
 theSkimm

Former assets

Regional Media Group 
Thirteen dailies and one weekly newspaper primarily in the Southern United States, including titles in Alabama, California, Florida, Louisiana, North Carolina and South Carolina.
 The Gadsden Times of Gadsden, Alabama
 The Tuscaloosa News of Tuscaloosa, Alabama
 Petaluma Argus-Courier of Petaluma, California (weekly)
 The Press Democrat of Santa Rosa, California
 The Gainesville Sun of Gainesville, Florida
 The Ledger of Lakeland, Florida
 Sarasota Herald-Tribune of Sarasota, Florida
 Star-Banner of Ocala, Florida
 The Courier of Houma, Louisiana
 The Daily Comet of Thibodaux, Louisiana
 The Dispatch of Lexington, North Carolina
 Times-News of Hendersonville, North Carolina
 The Star-News of Wilmington, North Carolina
 Spartanburg Herald-Journal of Spartanburg, South Carolina

Broadcast Media Group

Radio stations

Television stations

New England Media Group 
This comprised two of the three largest-circulation newspapers in Massachusetts, purchased in 1993 (Boston) and 1999 (Worcester). This group also included boston.com.
 The Boston Globe of Boston, Massachusetts
Boston.com
BostonGlobe.com
 Telegram & Gazette of Worcester, Massachusetts
Telegram.com
 Metro Boston LLC (49%)
The Globe and the other New England assets were sold to John Henry in August 2013, with the sale taking effect at the end of October. In 2014, Henry sold the Telegram & Gazette to another media group.

Other
 Fenway Sports Group (17.75%, sold in 2012)
 Boston Red Sox
 Fenway Park
 Liverpool Football Club
 Fenway Sports Management
 New England Sports Network (NESN) (80%)
 Discovery Times (50%)
 Roush Fenway Racing (50%)
 Donohue Malbaie, Inc. (49%) with Abitibi-Consolidated
 About.com (sold in 2012) 
 ConsumerSearch.com (bought by About.com on May 7, 2007 for US$33 million)
 Baseline StudioSystems (sold in 2011)
  Fake Love (shut down in 2020) 
 HelloSociety

References

External links
 The New York Times Company website
 Columbia Journalism Review ownership listing

New York Times Company
Company

fr:Liste des actifs détenus par The New York Times Company